Bradley Thomas Fink (born 17 April 2003) is a Swiss professional footballer who plays as a striker for Swiss Super League club Basel.

Club career
Born in Cham, Fink played his first youth football with local club SC Cham. He was soon discovered by Luzern and moved on to them soon afterwards and passed through their youth academy. In July 2019, Fink joined Borussia Dortmund. On 17 January 2022, Fink made his professional debut in a 3. Liga match for Borussia Dortmund II against Waldhof Mannheim.

In August 2022, Fink signed a four-year contract with FC Basel. He joined Basel's first team for their 2022–23 season under head coach Alexander Frei and made his debut in the Swiss Cup match on 21 August 2022. He scored his first goal for the club in the same game, as Basel won 5–0 against local amateur club FC Allschwil. 

Fink played his domestic league debut for the club in the away game in the Letzigrund on 28 August as Basel won 4–2 against Zürich. He scored his first league goal for his new club in the home game in the St. Jakob-Park on 1 October. He was substituted in for Wouter Burger in the 83rd minute and scored the winning goal within one minute as Basel won 3–2 against St. Gallen, heading home a cross from Michael Lang.

International career
Fink has represented Switzerland at various youth international levels.

Personal life
Fink can also play for England at international level.

References

External links

Bradley Fink at FC Basel Archiv 

Living people
2003 births
People from Cham, Switzerland
Swiss people of English descent
Sportspeople from the canton of Zug
Swiss men's footballers
Association football forwards
Switzerland youth international footballers
3. Liga players
Borussia Dortmund II players
FC Basel players
Expatriate footballers in Germany
Swiss expatriate sportspeople in Germany
Swiss expatriate footballers
Switzerland under-21 international footballers